The discography of Swedish rapper Einár consists of four studio albums and 42 music singles.

Studio albums

Extended plays

Singles

As lead artist

As featured artist

Other charted songs 

Other releases
2018: "Gucci"

Notes

References

Discographies of Swedish artists